The Girl Guides Cook Islands Association is the national Guiding organization of the Cook Islands. It served 1,111 members (as of 2003). Founded in 1928, the girls-only organization became an associate member of the World Association of Girl Guides and Girl Scouts in 1993 and a full member in 2014. 

Guiding began in the Cook Islands in 1928, when the first Guide company began in the capital, Avarua on Rarotonga, and the islands were regarded as a province of the Girl Guide Association of New Zealand. Ranger patrols were first set up in 1935 and the first brownie pack was registered in 1937. The first outer island company was started in Aitutaki in 1948. The 1950s were an era of growth, with the foundation of new companies both on Rarotonga and on the outer islands. The Cook Islands became a branch association of the GGANZ, membership increased, and leaders attended overseas training and other events. UNESCO funded a full-time trainer from 1956 to 1958. With good administration and a more active program, Guiding became fully accepted by the community and supported by the churches. In 1986 the association fulfilled a longstanding ambition by obtaining its own headquarters. Membership continued to grow and in 1992 a Deed of Transfer was signed making the Branch Association of the Cook Islands independent of the GGANZ.

See also
 Cook Islands Boy Scout Association
Vaine Nooana-Arioka

References 
 World Association of Girl Guides and Girl Scouts, World Bureau (2002), Trefoil Round the World. Eleventh Edition 1997. 

World Association of Girl Guides and Girl Scouts member organizations
Scouting and Guiding in the Cook Islands
Youth organizations established in 1928